The Hard Rubber Orchestra is a jazz band led by composer and trumpeter John Korsrud in Vancouver, British Columbia, Canada. Founded in 1990, it has a shifting membership of 15-30 musicians. It is known for spotlighting work by contemporary composers and won the Alcan Performing Arts Award in 2004.

History 
The Hard Rubber Orchestra was founded in 1990 by John Korsrud.  It had instrumentation similar to a big band, but the music was "an unholy mashup of minimalism, free jazz, noise, and funk".

In 1992, a non-profit "Hard Rubber Music Society" was created as a vehicle for funding the orchestra. It operates with a mix of private donations, city funding, and Canada Council grants.

Notable commissions 
The Hard Rubber Orchestra is characteristically open to new music. It has commissioned over 40 works from 30 contemporary jazz and classical composers. Here are some highlights.
 John Korsrud, Giorgio Magnanensi, and Brad Turner contributed original compositions to the  February 2005 multidisciplinary theatre piece, Enter/Exit.
 Ice Age 2010, where the Hard Rubber Orchestra played pieces by Peter Hannan, Brad Turner, Tony Wilson, and Bill Runge, while dancers and ice skaters performed on a hockey rink, was part of the Cultural Olympiad festival which accompanied the 2010 Winter Olympics in Vancouver.
 Linda Bouchard, and Scott Good (Vancouver Symphony Orchestra composer-in-residence), contributed compositions to the Hard Rubber Orchestra's 20th-anniversary concert on May 14, 2011.
 Kenny Wheeler composed a 30-minute piece, which the orchestra premiered in Vancouver on October 19, 2013. The orchestra was joined by trumpeter Mike Herriott, singer Christine Duncan, and trombonist Hugh Fraser as conductor.

Awards 
In 2004, the Hard Rubber Orchestra won the C$60,000 Alcan Performing Arts Award. This funded their February 2005 work, Enter/Exit, a multidisciplinary theatre piece featuring compositions by John Korsrud, Giorgio Magnanensi, and Brad Turner. Videographers HoneyBee Visuals, set designer Andreas Kahre, and director Kim Collier also contributed.

Their album Iguana was a Juno Award nominee for Instrumental Album of the Year at the Juno Awards of 2023.

References

External links 
 
 
 

Canadian experimental musical groups
Canadian jazz ensembles
Musical groups from Vancouver